Penthicodes is a genus of planthoppers belonging to the family Fulgoridae, subfamily Aphaeninae: found in South-East Asia. The genus name was formerly treated as feminine, but in 2022 it was revised to masculine in accordance with ICZN Article 30.1.4.4, changing the spelling of several species' names.

Species
Fulgoromorpha Lists On the WEB (FLOW) includes:
Subgenus Penthicodes (Ereosoma) Kirkaldy, 1906
 Penthicodes astraea (Stål, 1864) 
 Penthicodes atomaria (Weber, 1801) 
 Penthicodes bimaculatus (Schmidt, 1905) 
 Penthicodes caja (Walker, 1851) 
 Penthicodes celebicus Constant, 2010 
 Penthicodes pulchellus (Guérin-Méneville, 1838) 
 Penthicodes quadrimaculatus Lallemand, 1963 
 Penthicodes rugulosus (Stål, 1870) 
 Penthicodes variegatus (Guérin-Méneville, 1829) 
 Penthicodes warleti Constant, 2010
Subgenus Penthicodes (Penthicodes) Blanchard, 1845
 Penthicodes farinosus (Weber, 1801)
 Penthicodes nicobaricus (Stål, 1869)

References

Notes

External links

Hemiptera of Asia
Auchenorrhyncha genera
Aphaeninae